Bánh phu thê or bánh xu xê, is a Vietnamese dessert made from rice with mung bean stuffing wrapped in a box made of pandan leaves. The dessert was traditionally given by a suitor but is now part of many wedding banquets. It is traditional for a bridegroom to send bánh phu thê to the bride on the couple's wedding day to symbolize wishes for a happy future.

See also
Traditional Vietnamese wedding

References

Vietnamese desserts
Bánh
Rice cakes
Wedding food